The 2016 Launceston Tennis International was a professional tennis tournament played on outdoor hard courts. It was the second edition (for men) and fifth edition (for women) of the tournament which was part of the 2016 ATP Challenger Tour and the 2016 ITF Women's Circuit, offering a total of $75,000 in prize money for both genders. It took place in Launceston, Tasmania, Australia, on 1–8 February 2016.

Men's singles entrants

Seeds 

 1 Rankings as of 18 January 2016.

Other entrants 
The following players received wildcards into the singles main draw:
  Harry Bourchier
  Blake Mott
  Alexei Popyrin
  Max Purcell

The following player received entry into the singles main draw as a lucky loser:
  Jarryd Chaplin

The following players received entry from the qualifying draw:
  Thomas Fancutt
  Marc Polmans
  Jose Statham
  Stefanos Tsitsipas

Women's singles entrants

Seeds 

 1 Rankings as of 18 January 2016.

Other entrants 
The following players received wildcards into the singles main draw:
  Naiktha Bains
  Abbie Myers
  Tammi Patterson
  Dayana Yastremska

The following players received entry from the qualifying draw:
  Lizette Cabrera
  Jennifer Elie
  Sabrina Santamaria
  Zuzana Zlochová

The following player received entry by a protected ranking:
  Miharu Imanishi

Champions

Men's singles 

  Blake Mott def.  Andrey Golubev 6–7(4–7) , 6–1, 6–2

Women's singles 

  Han Xinyun def.  Alla Kudryavtseva 6–1, 6–1

Men's doubles 

  Luke Saville /  Jordan Thompson def.  Dayne Kelly /  Matt Reid 6–1, 4–6, [13–11]

Women's doubles 

  You Xiaodi /  Zhu Lin def.  Nadiia Kichenok /  Mandy Minella  2–6, 7–5, [10–7]

References

External links 
 2016 Launceston Tennis International at tennis.com.au

2016 ITF Women's Circuit
2016 ATP Challenger Tour
2016 in Australian tennis
2016
February 2016 sports events in Australia